Arekere is a residential area on Bannerghatta Road in South Bangalore. The name Arekere (Are: Half, Kere: lake) originates from a water reservoir in the area.

Some of the residential areas within Arekere are: Arekere Mico Layout, which is a BDA layout developed in the late 1970s, Samrat Layout, Pandurangnagar, Shantiniketan Layout and Sarvabhoumanagar.

Infrastructure
The neighbourhood has undergone rapid development since the early 2000s due to the presence of information technology and BPO companies. BPL Medical, Apollo Hospitals and Fortis Hospital are located nearby. Educational institutes in the vicinity include IIM Bangalore, Stepping Stones, BGS National Public School and Mitra Academy

Accessibility
Bannerghatta road, one of the main arterial roads in the southern part of city passes through Arekere. With new neighbourhoods opening up further down the city, Arekere has witnessed increased congestion over the years. The under-construction Kalena Agrahara-Nagawara route of Namma Metro passes through the area and is expected to decongest vehicular traffic once it is functional. The locality is well connected to other parts of the city and to the airport by BMTC buses.

See also 
 Arekere Lake

Location in context

References

External links 

Neighbourhoods in Bangalore